Fms-related tyrosine kinase 3 ligand (FLT3LG) is a protein which in humans is encoded by the FLT3LG gene.

Flt3 ligand (FL) is a hematopoietic four helical bundle cytokine. It is structurally homologous to stem cell factor (SCF) and colony stimulating factor 1 (CSF-1). In synergy with other growth factors, Flt3 ligand stimulates the proliferation and differentiation of various blood cell progenitors. For example, it is a major growth factor stimulating the growth of dendritic cells.

FLT3L functions as a cytokine and growth factor that increases the number of immune cells (lymphocytes (B cells and T cells)) by activating the hematopoietic progenitors. It acts by binding to and activating FLT3 (CD135) which is found on what (in mice) are called multipotent progenitor (MPP) and common lymphoid progenitor (CLP) cells. It also induces the mobilization of the hematopoietic progenitors and stem cells in vivo which may help the system to kill cancer cells.

FLT3L is crucial for steady-state plasmacytoid dendritic cell (pDC) and classical dendritic cell (cDC) development. A lack of FLT3L results in low levels of dendritic cells.

In parasite clearance 
FLT3L and its receptor are involved in the mammalian immune response to malaria. In strains of plasmodium, FLT3L was shown to be released from mast cells and cause the expansion of dendritic cells, leading to the activation of CD8+ T cells. The same paper suggested that FLT3L release was caused by stimulation of mast cells with uric acid, produced from a precursor secreted by the plasmodium parasite. .

In immunotherapy 
In situ vaccine (ISV), combining Flt3L, local radiotherapy, and a TLR3 agonist (poly-ICLC), could recruit, antigen-load and activate intratumoral cross-presenting dendritic cells (DCs) in indolent non-Hodgkin’s lymphomas (iNHLs) treatment (clinical trial: NCT01976585). In this study, intratumoral Flt3L was able to (1) induce the accumulation of large numbers of TLR3+ DCs in the tumor and (2) mediate , together with local irradiation, cross-presentation of TAA by DCs in vitro and in vivo.

References

Further reading

External links 
 FLT3 signaling

Cytokines
Growth factors